The men's English billiards doubles tournament at the 2002 Asian Games in Busan took place on 6 October 2002 at Dongju College Gymnasium.

Schedule
All times are Korea Standard Time (UTC+09:00)

Results

References 
2002 Asian Games Official Report, Page 288

External links 
 Official Website

Cue sports at the 2002 Asian Games